The Communauté de communes Coeur de Combrailles  is a former communauté de communes in the Puy-de-Dôme département and in the  Auvergne-Rhône-Alpes région of France. It was created in October 1999. It was merged into the new Communauté de communes du Pays de Saint-Éloy in January 2017.

Composition 
This Communauté de communes comprised 10 communes:
Ayat-sur-Sioule
Biollet
Charensat
Espinasse
Gouttières
Saint-Gervais-d'Auvergne
Saint-Julien-la-Geneste
Saint-Priest-des-Champs
Sainte-Christine
Sauret-Besserve

See also 
Communes of the Puy-de-Dôme department

References 

Coeur de Combrailles